The Best Of Sonny & Chér is the first compilation album by American pop duo Sonny & Cher, released on August 12 1967 by Atlantic/ATCO Records. It is one of their best selling albums in the US, reaching number 23 and spending 64 weeks on the Billboard albums chart.

Album information 

The Best of Sonny & Chér contains Sonny and Cher's hits released through Atco from 1965 to 1967, including "The Beat Goes On", "I Got You Babe", "But You're Mine" and "Little Man". The duo's first major hit, "Baby Don't Go", is not included in the album, as it was owned and released by Reprise Records prior to Sonny and Cher's signing with Atco.

This compilation was also remastered in the 1991 compilation The Beat Goes On: The Best Of Sonny & Cher alongside many other tracks. The original The Best of Sonny & Chér compilation album in its entirety remains unreleased on compact disc.

Track listing 
All tracks composed by Sonny Bono; except where indicated

Side A 
 "The Beat Goes On"  - 3:23
 "What Now My Love" (Carl Sigman, Gilbert Bécaud, Pierre Delanoë) - 3:28
 "I Got You Babe" - 3:11
 "Little Man" - 3:15
 "Just You" - 3:36
 "Let It Be Me" (Gilbert Bécaud, Mann Curtis, Pierre Delanoë) - 2:25

Side B 
 "A Beautiful Story" - 2:52
 "It's the Little Things" - 3:31
 "But You're Mine" - 3:02
 "Sing C'est La Vie" (Bono, Charles Greene, Brian Stone) - 3:39
 "Laugh At Me" - 2:50
 "Living For You" - 3:30

Charts

Credits

Personnel 
 Main vocals: Cher
 Main vocals: Sonny Bono

Production 
 Sonny Bono: Producer

References 

Sonny & Cher albums
1967 greatest hits albums
Atco Records compilation albums
Atlantic Records compilation albums
Albums produced by Sonny Bono